The Southern Sudan Autonomous Region was an autonomous region that existed in Southern Sudan between 1972 and 1983. It was established on 28 February 1972 by the Addis Ababa Agreement which ended the First Sudanese Civil War. The region was abolished on 5 June 1983 by the administration of Sudanese President Gaafar Nimeiry. Revocation of southern autonomy was one of the causes of the Second Sudanese Civil War which would continue until January 2005, when southern autonomy was restored; the region became the independent Republic of South Sudan in 2011.

Government and politics

Southern Sudan was governed by a High Executive Council which was led by a President of the High Executive Council. Abel Alier was the first President, holding that post between 1972 and 1978.

Legislative authority was vested in a People's Regional Assembly.

The autonomous region consisted of the three provinces of Equatoria, Bahr al-Ghazal, and Greater Upper Nile. Juba was the regional capital.

Heads of government of the Southern Sudan Autonomous Region (1972–1983)

Post-abolition
The Southern Sudan Autonomous Region was abolished in 1983. Between 1987 and 1989 a Council for the South existed in Southern Sudan. Following the signing of the Khartoum Peace Agreement of 1997, a Southern Sudan Coordination Council was established initially led by Riek Machar who was also appointed Assistant to the President of the Republic. This body was abolished in 2005 when the Autonomous Government of Southern Sudan was established.

See also

South Sudan
Comprehensive Peace Agreement
Southern Sudan Autonomous Region (2005–2011), the autonomous region that existed between 2005 and independence in 2011
Southern Sudanese independence referendum, 2011

References

First Sudanese Civil War
History of South Sudan
History of Sudan
Government of South Sudan
Government of Sudan
Second Sudanese Civil War
Autonomous regions
States and territories established in 1972
States and territories disestablished in 1983